Skrea is a locality in Falkenberg Municipality, Halland County, Sweden, with 1,064 inhabitants in 2010.

It was first mentioned in writing in 1447. Remains of houses used 100–550 have been found in the village. The nature reserve Grimsholmen is near the village.

References

External links
Excavations in Skrea - settlement and cultural landscape 1200 BC - AD 500

Populated places in Halland County
Populated places in Falkenberg Municipality